Marco Delvecchio  (born 7 April 1973) is a retired Italian footballer, who played as a forward. Although he played for several Italian clubs throughout his career, he spent most of it at A.S. Roma, where he is still remembered by the club's fans for his ease in scoring against rivals S.S. Lazio in the Derby della Capitale, and for the contributions he made to the club's league title victory in 2001. At international level, he represented Italy on 22 occasions between 1998 and 2004, scoring 4 goals, taking part at UEFA Euro 2000, reaching the final of the tournament, in which he scored, and at the 2002 FIFA World Cup.

Delvecchio currently collaborates with a Roman private radio station as football-pundit.

Club career
Delvecchio was born in Milan, Italy, where he started his professional career with Inter (1992 and 1994–95). He went on to represent Venezia (1992–93) and Udinese (1993–94) before joining Roma in 1995. His career reached a high when he transferred to Roma, becoming a key player at the club. He notably won the Scudetto with Roma in 2001, followed by the 2001 Supercoppa Italiana, under manager Fabio Capello, alongside forwards Francesco Totti, Gabriel Batistuta, and Vincenzo Montella. He also reached the Coppa Italia Final with Roma during the 2002–03 season. He subsequently played one season for Brescia in 2004–05, and was then bought by Parma in 2005. In 2006, Parma released him and he went on to join Ascoli on a free transfer.

On 10 May 2007, Delvecchio and Ascoli mutually agreed to terminate his contract following a combination of a knee injury and Ascoli's relegation to Serie B, the latter following a 1–0 loss to Torino three days earlier. He scored twice in ten appearances for the club.

After one season of inactivity, Delvecchio decided to abandon professional football altogether and accept an offer from Eccellenza Lazio side Pescatori Ostia, where he scored 34 goals throughout the season.

International career
Delvecchio was a member of the Italy under-21 teams that won the UEFA European Under-21 Championship in 1994 and 1996; in total, he scored 6 goals for the under-21 side in 24 appearances between 1992 and 1996. He also represented Italy at the 1996 Olympics in Atlanta, making three appearances and scoring once.

He made his international for the Italy senior side debut under manager Dino Zoff on 16 December 1998, in a friendly match in Rome against the FIFA World-Stars, commemorating the first century since the founding of the Italian Football Federation. He was subsequently called up by Zoff for the 22-man Italian squad that took part at Euro 2000, making three appearances throughout the tournament. His first international goal came against France in the Euro 2000 final, although Italy later conceded an equaliser in the final minute of stoppage time, and were defeated in extra-time from a golden goal. Delvecchio travelled to Korea with the 23-man Italian 2002 World Cup squad, but did not play during the tournament under manager Giovanni Trapattoni. After the World Cup, he scored a goal in a 2–0 friendly win over Northern Ireland, and on 18 February 2004, he made his final appearance for Italy against the Czech Republic, missing out on Trapattoni's Euro 2004 squad. Delvecchio scored 3 goals in 14 starts for the Italy senior team, scoring 4 goals in 22 total appearances for Italy between 1998 and 2004.

Style of play
Delvecchio was a versatile, powerful, determined, and hard-working forward, who was capable of playing anywhere along the front line, as well as in midfield, as either a winger or as an attacking midfielder, although he was primarily utilised as a central striker or as a supporting forward. Due to his height and strength, his main attributes were his aerial ability, as well as his finishing, and his positioning skills. Despite his large, slender frame, he was also a good passer and dribbler, which enabled him to link-up with other players, create chances, and provide teammates with assists.

Personal life and media
Marco was a contestant on the Italian version of Dancing with the Stars, Ballando con le Stelle 2012, where he placed second alongside professional dancer Sara Di Vaira, with whom he later began a relationship.

Career statistics

Club

International

Scores and results list Italy's goal tally first, score column indicates score after each Delvecchio goal.

Honours

Club
Roma
 Serie A: 2000–01
 Supercoppa Italiana: 2001

International
Italy
UEFA European Championship runner-up: 2000

Orders
  5th Class / Knight: Cavaliere Ordine al Merito della Repubblica Italiana: 2000

References

External links

 
 
Delvecchio Cancels Ascoli Contract – Goal.com, 5 November 2007
FC Baia Mare sign Delvecchio – LigaB.ro, 7 April 2010

1973 births
Living people
Footballers from Milan
Association football forwards
Italian footballers
Italy international footballers
Inter Milan players
A.S. Roma players
Parma Calcio 1913 players
Venezia F.C. players
Udinese Calcio players
Brescia Calcio players
Ascoli Calcio 1898 F.C. players
Serie A players
Serie B players
Competitors at the 1993 Mediterranean Games
Italy under-21 international footballers
Olympic footballers of Italy
Footballers at the 1996 Summer Olympics
UEFA Euro 2000 players
2002 FIFA World Cup players
Mediterranean Games competitors for Italy
Knights of the Order of Merit of the Italian Republic